The following is a list of international organizations in which the Philippines officially participates.

List 
 Asian Development Bank (ADB)
 Asia-Pacific Economic Cooperation (APEC)
 Asia-Pacific Telecommunity (APT)
 Association of Southeast Asian Nations (ASEAN)
 Association of Southeast Asian Nations Regional Forum (ARF)
 Bank for International Settlements (BIS)
 Colombo Plan (CP)
 East Asia Summit (EAS)
 Food and Agriculture Organization (FAO)
 Group of 24 (G24)
 Group of 77 (G77)
 International Atomic Energy Agency (IAEA)
 International Bank for Reconstruction and Development (IBRD)
 International Chamber of Commerce (ICC)
 International Civil Aviation Organization (ICAO)
 International Criminal Court (ICCt) (signatory)
 International Criminal Police Organization (Interpol)
 International Development Association (IDA)
 International Federation of Red Cross and Red Crescent Societies (IFRCS)
 International Finance Corporation (IFC)
 International Fund for Agricultural Development (IFAD)
 International Human Rights Defense Committee (IHO)
 International Hydrographic Organization (IHO)
 International Labour Organization (ILO)
 International Maritime Organization (IMO)
 International Mobile Satellite Organization (IMSO)
 International Monetary Fund (IMF)
 International Olympic Committee (IOC)
 International Organization for Migration (IOM)
 International Organization for Standardization (ISO)
 International Paralympic Committee (IPC)
 International Red Cross and Red Crescent Movement (ICRM)
 International Telecommunication Union (ITU)
 International Telecommunications Satellite Organization (ITSO)
 International Trade Union Confederation (ITUC)
 Inter-Parliamentary Union (IPU)
 Multilateral Investment Guarantee Agency (MIGA)
 Nonaligned Movement (NAM)
 Organisation for the Prohibition of Chemical Weapons (OPCW)
 Organization of American States (OAS) (observer)
 Pacific Islands Forum (PIF) (partner)
 Unión Latina
 United Nations (UN)
 United Nations Conference on Trade and Development (UNCTAD)
 United Nations Educational, Scientific, and Cultural Organization (UNESCO)
 United Nations High Commissioner for Refugees (UNHCR)
 United Nations Industrial Development Organization (UNIDO)
 United Nations Integrated Mission in Timor-Leste (UNMIT)
 United Nations Mission in Liberia (UNMIL)
 United Nations Mission in the Sudan (UNMIS)
 United Nations Operation in Cote d'Ivoire (UNOCI)
 United Nations Stabilization Mission in Haiti (MINUSTAH)
 Universal Postal Union (UPU)
 World Confederation of Labour (WCL)
 World Customs Organization (WCO)
 World Federation of Trade Unions (WFTU)
 World Health Organization (WHO)
 World Intellectual Property Organization (WIPO)
 World Meteorological Organization (WMO)
 World Tourism Organization (UNWTO)
 World Trade Organization (WTO)

See also 

Foreign policy of the Philippines
Foreign relations of the Philippines
Philippines and the United Nations

References 

Philippines
Foreign relations of the Philippines
Philippines and the United Nations